The International Association of Conference Interpreters - AIIC (AIIC – Association Internationale des Interprètes de Conférence)  was founded in 1953. It represents over 3,000 members present in over 100 countries.

Overview
AIIC is the only global association of conference interpreters. Since the early days of modern conference interpreting, AIIC has promoted high standards of quality and ethics in the profession and represented the interests of its practitioners.

AIIC is active in all areas affecting conference interpreting and works for the benefit of all conference interpreters and for the profession as a whole. AIIC sets professional and ethical standards for the profession and promotes the working conditions that high quality interpreting requires. The Association also contributes its expertise to ensure that future generations of interpreters will be trained to today's high standards.

The association has a strict admissions procedure based on a peer review system, intended to guarantee high-quality interpreting and professionalism. Candidates must be sponsored by interpreters who have been AIIC members for at least five years. AIIC members are required to abide by the association’s code of ethics and its professional standards.

Partnerships
AIIC liaises with a number of international organisations (e.g., the EU and the United Nations) and negotiates the working conditions for all of their non-staff interpreters, including non-members. The AIIC goals are to secure acceptable working conditions for interpreters, to ensure professional interpretation, and to raise public awareness of the interpreting profession. It is also involved in other areas of the profession, such as:
 programmes for young conference interpreters - VEGA;
 continuing professional development;
 standardisation;
 new technologies in conference interpretation;
 court and legal interpretation;
 interpretation in conflict areas, and 
 "preservation of World Linguistic Heritage".

AIIC has joined forces with IAPTI, Red T and FIT in an effort to put pressure on governments to ensure the long-term safety of linguists who served their troops in Afghanistan.

Publications
AIIC issues a webzine named Communicate!.

Naissance d'une profession [Birth of a Profession]: a book describing conference interpreting from its beginnings in the early 20th century to the present. (2013)

References

External links
 
 

International professional associations
Organizations established in 1953
Interpreters associations
International organisations based in Switzerland